Watkins Mill High School is located in Gaithersburg, an incorporated city in Montgomery County, Maryland.

The school is named after the Watkins family, who owned a mill on the property. The school's colors are orange and blue.  Watkins Mill is home to such programs as the International Baccalaureate Program, PLTW, and Academy of Finance. Watkins Mill is part of the Montgomery County Public Schools system. The principal is Carol Goddard.
The school opened in 1989 at 269,706 ft² with a 28,140 ft² addition in 1994 and a 3,733 ft² in 1999 with 300 ft² of renovation.  The school now encompasses 301,579 ft².

Demographics
According to the Montgomery County Public Schools regulatory accountability report, the ethnic demographic breakdown of students is:

Ethnicity
 African American: 29.8%
 Hispanic: 50.2%
 Non-Hispanic White: 7.7%
 Asian: 8.0%
 American Indian/Alaska native: <5%
 Native Hawaiian or other Pacific islander: <5%

Services
 Students receiving free and reduced-price meals (FARMS): 50.2%
 English for speakers of other languages (ESOL): 24.2%
 Students receiving special education services: 11.9%

Sports

Watkins Mill High School offers the following sports:

Baseball (boys)
Basketball (boys & girls)
Bocce (coed)
Cheerleading (coed)
Cross Country (boys & girls)
Field Hockey (girls)
Football (boys)
Golf (coed)
Indoor Track (boys & girls)
Lacrosse (boys & girls)
Poms (girls)
Soccer (boys & girls) 
Softball (girls)
Swim & Dive (boys & girls)
Tennis (boys & girls)
Track & Field (boys & girls)
Volleyball (boys & girls & coed)
Wrestling (boys)
POM's (girls)

The school mascot is Wally the Wolverine.

In 2011, Watkins Mill won the 3A Maryland boys state soccer title.

Notable alumni
Justin Carter (born 1987): basketball player for Maccabi Kiryat Gat of the Israeli Premier League
Paul Rabil: professional lacrosse player for Atlas Lacrosse Club and founder of the Premier Lacrosse League attended Watkins Mill during his freshman year.
Chris Van Dusen Class of 1997 graduate, Van Dusen is an American television producer and screenwriter. 
Telfar Clemens: Liberian-American fashion designer and the founder of the label TELFAR.

References

External links

Watkins Mill High School data at publicschoolreview.com
Watkins Mill High School Newspaper

Public high schools in Montgomery County, Maryland
International Baccalaureate schools in Maryland
Educational institutions established in 1989
Buildings and structures in Gaithersburg, Maryland
1989 establishments in Maryland